Marcelo Alexandre (born 22 January 1963) is an Argentine former cyclist. He competed at the 1984 Summer Olympics and the 1988 Summer Olympics.

References

External links
 

1963 births
Living people
Argentine male cyclists
Olympic cyclists of Argentina
Cyclists at the 1984 Summer Olympics
Cyclists at the 1988 Summer Olympics
Cyclists from Buenos Aires
Cyclists at the 1983 Pan American Games
Pan American Games medalists in cycling
Pan American Games silver medalists for Argentina
Medalists at the 1983 Pan American Games